Tabitha Mukami Muigai Karanja is a Kenyan businesswoman, entrepreneur and industrialist. She is the founder and current Chief Executive Officer of Keroche Breweries, the first large brewery in Kenya owned by a non multinational company. Keroche accounts for 20% of Kenya's beer consumption, as of October 2012.

Early life and education
Tabitha was born near Kijabe, in central Kenya. After attending Kenyan schools, she took up employment in the Ministry of Tourism as an Accounting Clerk. She met and married her husband, who owned a successful hardware store in Naivasha town. In 1997, the couple closed the hardware store and went into the wine-making business.

Career
Beginning in 1997, Tabitha Karanja and her husband, started making fortified wine, targeting the lower end of the market. In 2007, when the government enacted heavy taxes on locally made wines, her product was priced out of the market. She switched to manufacturing ready-to-drink gin and vodka, which her state-of-the-art factory still makes today. In 2008, she added beer to her repertoire of alcoholic drinks, beginning with a brand called "Summit". In 2013, the factory began expansion plans to increase beer production from 60,000 bottles per day to 600,000 bottles per day. The refurbished plant, which cost KSh5 billion (US$55.5 million), was commissioned by Adan Mohammed, the Cabinet Secretary for Industrialization, on 31 March 2015.

Keroche Breweries CEO Tabitha Karanja won the Nakuru Senatorial seat in 2022, and is the Nakuru County Senator, Kenya.

 Karanja's party ticket and garnered 442,864 votes against her main competitor, Lawrence Karanja's 163,625 votes.

Personal life
Tabitha is married to Joseph Karanja and together, they are the parents of four children; James Karanja, Anerlisa Muigai, Edward Muigai and the late Tecra Muigai. Joseph Muigai Karanja serves as the Chairman of Keroche Breweries  Limited

See also
 List of wealthiest people in Kenya
 Economy of Kenya

References

External links
 Website of Keroche Breweries Limited
 Keroche Hires Sales Staff for New Plant

Living people
21st-century Kenyan businesswomen
21st-century Kenyan businesspeople
People from Nakuru County
Kikuyu people
Kenyan Christians
1964 births
Women in brewing